Heterospingus is a small genus of medium-sized birds in the tanager family Thraupidae that are found in the forests of Central and South America.

Taxonomy and species list
The genus Heterospingus was introduced in 1898 by the American ornithologist Robert Ridgway with the sulphur-rumped tanager as the type species. The name combines the Ancient Greek heteros meaning "different" with spingos meaning "finch".

The genus contains two species:

References

 
Bird genera
Taxa named by Robert Ridgway